"Gimax", pseudonym of Carlo Franchi (1 January 1938 – 13 January 2021) was an Italian racing driver. He never raced under his real name, and his son has also raced using the name "Gimax".

He entered one World Championship Formula One Grand Prix with Surtees, the 1978 Italian Grand Prix, but failed to qualify. He also participated in one non-Championship Formula One race, the 1979 Dino Ferrari Grand Prix.

Sportscars 
"Gimax" was a regular entrant in Italian sportscar racing during the 1970s and in 1978, he also competed in European Sportscar Championship, a series set up for that season in order to allow Group 6 prototypes to continue to compete in Europe for their own championship after the cancellation of the World Sports Car Championship.

The series was separated into two categories, one for the 2-Litre cars and the other for the larger capacity cars: "Gimax" won the 2-litre drivers' championship in an Osella, while Porsche driver Reinhold Joest won the Drivers' Championship for the larger capacity cars.

Complete Formula One World Championship results
(key)

References

1938 births
2021 deaths
Italian racing drivers
Italian Formula One drivers
World Sportscar Championship drivers
Surtees Formula One drivers
British Formula One Championship drivers
Pseudonyms